A camauro (from the Latin camelaucum and from the Greek kamelauchion, meaning "camel skin hat") is a cap traditionally worn by the Pope of the Catholic Church.

Papal camauros are made from red wool or velvet with white ermine trim, and are usually worn during the winter in place of the zucchetto. Like the biretta worn by lower clergy and the mortarboard worn by academics, the camauro derives from the academic cap (the pileus), originally worn to protect tonsured clerical heads in the cold season. It is often worn with a red mozzetta.

History 
The camauro has been part of the papal wardrobe since the 12th century. Until 1464, it was worn by cardinals, without the ermine trim; from that date, the camauro became exclusively a papal garment and cardinals wore the scarlet biretta instead. The papal camauro fell into disuse after the death of John XXIII in 1963. It was revived once only in December 2005 by Benedict XVI. Benedict's choice prompted media comparisons to Santa Claus and Father Christmas; Saint Nicholas, who may have been the inspiration for the legend of Santa Claus, was bishop of Myra in the early fourth century.

A camauro was part of the headdress of the Doge of Venice, worn under the corno ducale or stiff peaked cap. Every Easter Monday, the doge headed a procession from San Marco to the convent of San Zaccaria where the abbess presented him a new linen camauro crafted by the nuns.

Notes

References

External links

 About the camauro
The Philippi Collection
 About the skull cap 
 'Santa Pope' woos Vatican crowds (BBC News, 22 December 2005))
 History of the Skullcap (PDF, p. 21–22)
 Various popes wearing the camauro on a church watching blog
 Pictures of Camauro and other clerical headgear, information and literature in German language
 Picture with summer-camauro in amaranth red silk, white camauro in silk-damask worn during the Octave of Easter and winter-camauro in red velvet

Formal insignia
Hats
Religious headgear
Papal vestments